Khurba Airport (also given as Komsomolsk South, Khurba, Uchastok, and Kalinovka)  is an air base (also used as an airport) in Khabarovsk Krai, Russia  south of Komsomolsk-on-Amur.  This medium-sized base has considerable tarmac space and an extended area of revetments.  It handles medium-sized airliners.

Units stationed at Komsomolsk-na-Amur/Khurba include:
 277 BAP (277th Bomber Aviation Regiment) currently changing from flying Sukhoi Su-24M2s in the 1990-2000s to the Sukhoi Su-34 with the first 10 delivered.
 Deployed to Lida (air base) in Belarus as part of the 2022 Russian invasion of Ukraine
 216 IAP (216th Interceptor Aviation Regiment) flying Sukhoi Su-27 aircraft during 1986–1987 in addition to 277 BAP).
 26 Gv OPIB (26th Guards Independent Fighter-Bomber Regiment) flying Sukhoi Su-17M3 aircraft at the end of the Cold War.  This unit operated under 1st Air Army (1 OA), i.e. Far East Air Army).

History
Khurba Airport began as a military airfield garrison Khurba-2. The airfield was built during the Great Patriotic War with its old original runway with length of 810 meters is not currently in use. At the airport deployed:
From November 1948 to June 1962: 311th Fighter Regiment defense on the Yak-9, MiG-15, MiG-17 and Su-9. Disbanded at the airport June 21, 1962 [1]
From 1991 to 1998: 216th Fighter Aviation Regiment with Su-27 airplanes
From October 1970 to September 1, 2009: 277th Bomber Aviation Regiment Mlavsky Red Banner on the Sukhoi Su-24M

Later, the garrison was reorganized to the 6988-th Air Base. The airfield was built for the Ministry of Defense standards with scattered parking, arched reinforced concrete shelters for aircraft and reserve a dirt runway parallel to the concrete.

The airport regularly worked in Soviet times with daily flying international flights for the Far East region.

1990s to 2000s
From the late 1990s to late 2000s, the airport was effectively closed to passenger traffic, in the summer time (periodically) flying to Moscow JSC "Krasnoyarsk airlines" airplanes Tu-154 with a stopover in Krasnoyarsk (once a week). In summer 2009, after a decade flights began to perform again in Moscow - the carriage is performed airline "Vladivostok Avia" in the aircraft Tu-204-300. In late 2011, "Vladivostok Avia" was purchased by Aeroflot, whose leadership has recognized the flights to and from Komsomolsk-on-Amur are unprofitable, and a major industrial center of the Far East was again left without a direct air link to the capital.

2010s
In 2016 the airport was privatized with its shares sold for 70.15 million ruble to a St. Petersburg "EVM Property". It is planned to resume air service between Komsomolsk-on-Amur and cities such as Khabarovsk, Yuzhno-Sakhalinsk, Nikolayevsk-on-Amur, Okhotsk, Vladivostok, Petropavlovsk-Kamchatsky and Irkutsk. In the future, it will be established air communication with Moscow. It is expected that the airport will open at least five regional flights a week.

Airlines and destinations

See also
Komsomolsk-na-Amure Dzyomgi Airport, which is north of the city

References

External links

Komsomolsk-on-Amur Official website 
http://gc.kls2.com/airport/KXK

Soviet Air Force bases
Soviet Frontal Aviation
Soviet Air Defence Force bases
Russian Air Force bases
Airports in Khabarovsk Krai